Cherdchai Suwannang (born 25 September 1969) is a Thai football coach and retired defender who played for Bangkok Bank F.C. from 1989 to 1997 and for the Thailand national team, including at the 1992 Asian Cup.

References

External links
11v11 Profile

Cherdchai Suwannang
Cherdchai Suwannang
Southeast Asian Games medalists in football
Association football defenders
Living people
1969 births
Competitors at the 1995 Southeast Asian Games
Cherdchai Suwannang